Alfons Alzamora Ametller (born May 20, 1979) is a Spanish professional basketball player currently playing for Bàsquet Girona of the Liga EBA.

Player career 
1996/99  FC Barcelona (youth team)
1999/00  FC Barcelona
2000/01  Caprabo Lleida
2001/03  FC Barcelona
2003/04  DKV Joventut
2004/06  Leche Río Breogán
2006/07  Vive Menorca
2007/11  Ricoh Manresa
2011/12  Lleida Bàsquet
2012/13  FC Barcelona Regal B
2013/17  Força Lleida
2017/  Bàsquet Girona

Honours 

Spain

Mediterranean Games Gold Medal: 1
2001

FC Barcelona

Euroleague: 1
2003
Korać Cup: 1
1999
ACB: 1
2003
Copa del Rey: 1
2003

Caprabo Lleida

LEB: 1
2001

External links
ACB Alfons Alzamora Profile
Basketpedya.com Profile

1979 births
Living people
Bàsquet Manresa players
CB Breogán players
Centers (basketball)
Competitors at the 2001 Mediterranean Games
Competitors at the 2005 Mediterranean Games
FC Barcelona Bàsquet players
FC Barcelona Bàsquet B players
Joventut Badalona players
Liga ACB players
Mediterranean Games bronze medalists for Spain
Mediterranean Games gold medalists for Spain
Mediterranean Games medalists in basketball
Menorca Bàsquet players
Spanish men's basketball players
Força Lleida CE players
CB Vic players